Gadon is a surname. Notable people with the surname include:

 Elinor Gadon (1925–2018), American cultural historian
 Larry Gadon (born 1958), Filipino lawyer and politician
 Sarah Gadon (born 1987), Canadian actress

See also
 Gadon, Somalia, village